Thibaut Privat (born 4 February 1979) is a former French international rugby union player. He played as a Lock for AS Béziers, Montferrand and Montpellier.

He was called up as an injury replacement for Olivier Brouzet at the 2003 Rugby World Cup.

Honours 
 Selected to represent France, 2001–2005
 Grand Slam 2002
 French rugby champion, 2010 with Montferrand
 European Challenge Cup 2007 with Montferrand
 French Championship finalist 2007, 2008, 2009 and 2010 with Montferrand

References

External links

EPC Rugby profile

1979 births
French rugby union players
Living people
France international rugby union players
ASM Clermont Auvergne players
Montpellier Hérault Rugby players
Sportspeople from Nîmes
Rugby union locks
AS Béziers Hérault players
Lyon OU players